Toby's Dinner Theatre is a Washington–Baltimore metropolitan area professional dinner theater based in Columbia, Maryland.

History

Soon after the establishment of the Columbia Center for Theatrical Arts (CCTA), Toby Orenstein decided to open a theater in her name. In 1979, she approached businessman James Rouse, the catalyst for the CCTA, and he agreed to helped start this endeavor. Shortly thereafter, a Virginia-based restaurant group operated by Steve Lewis approached Orenstein with a partnership offer for the Garland Dinner Theater in Columbia, Maryland. On December 4, 1979, Toby's Dinner Theater opened with a performance of Godspell. In a 2008 interview with the Maryland Women's Hall of Fame, Orenstein reflected on her apprehensiveness: On March 10, 2006, Toby's Dinner Theatre opened a second location in Baltimore, Maryland with a run of Beauty and the Beast. This location is now closed.

Facilities 
In 1979, Toby's Dinner Theatre opened at its current location in downtown Columbia, Maryland, adjacent to the Merriweather Post Pavilion and Lake Kittamaquindi. It has an indoor seating capacity of 300 individuals. The theatre has parking, buffet-style dinner, full bar, full menu, and live music and entertainment. Dinner is a mix of American cuisine. The facility is ADA compliant. Toby's is estimated to draw 4,000 subscribers and 80,000–102,000 patrons a year.

Recent Productions 
Recent productions include Dreamgirls, Joseph and the Amazing Technicolor Dreamcoat starring Caroline Bowman and Cathy Mundy, Beauty and the Beast, Show Boat, A Christmas Carol, Sister Act, Hairspray, Peter Pan, Into the Woods, South Pacific, and Newsies.

Awards

Helen Hayes Awards and Nominations

 2013 Outstanding Resident Musical Nomination - The Color Purple
 2015 Outstanding Ensemble in a Musical Nomination - Memphis, The Musical
 2015 Outstanding Ensemble in a Musical Nomination - Spamalot
 2016 Outstanding Ensemble in a Musical Nomination - Ragtime
 2016 Outstanding Musical - Ragtime

See also

 Columbia Center for Theatrical Arts
 Young Columbians
 Helen Hayes Award
 Theater in Washington, D.C.
 Greater Baltimore Theater Awards

References

External links
 

1979 establishments in Maryland
Theatres in Maryland
Regional theatre in the United States
Toby's Dinner Theatre
Theatres completed in 1979
Columbia, Maryland
Tourist attractions in Howard County, Maryland
Event venues established in 1979
Howard County, Maryland
Restaurants established in 1979
Restaurants in Maryland
Performing arts centers in Maryland
Performing arts in Maryland
Arts centers in Maryland
Buildings and structures in Columbia, Maryland
Companies based in Columbia, Maryland